Myristica teijsmannii is a species of plant in the family Myristicaceae. It is a tree endemic to Java in Indonesia. It is threatened by habitat loss.

References

teijsmannii
Endemic flora of Java
Endangered plants
Taxonomy articles created by Polbot
Taxobox binomials not recognized by IUCN